The 2019 season was Santos Futebol Clube's 107th season in existence and the club's sixty consecutive season in the top flight of Brazilian football. As well as the Campeonato Brasileiro, the club competes in the Copa do Brasil, the Campeonato Paulista and also in Copa Sudamericana.

Players

Squad information

Source: SantosFC.com.br (for appearances and goals), Wikipedia players' articles (for international appearances and goals), FPF (for contracts).

Reserve team

Copa Sudamericana squad

Appearances and goals

Last updated: 8 December 2019
Source: Match reports in Competitive matches, Soccerway

Goalscorers

Last updated: 8 December 2019
Source: Match reports in Competitive matches

Disciplinary record

As of 8 December 2019
Source: Match reports in Competitive matches
 = Number of bookings;  = Number of sending offs after a second yellow card;  = Number of sending offs by a direct red card.

Suspensions served

Managers

Transfers

Transfers in

Loans in

Transfers out

Loans out

Contracts

Pre-season and friendlies

Sources:

Competitions

Overview

Campeonato Brasileiro

Results summary

Results by round

League table

Matches

Copa do Brasil

First stage

Second stage

Third stage

Fourth stage

Round of 16

Campeonato Paulista

Results summary

Group stage

Matches

Knockout stage

Quarter-final

Semi-final

Copa Sudamericana

First stage

References

Notes

External links
Official Site 
Official YouTube Channel 

2019
Santos F.C.